Schuyler Elizabeth Fisk (pronounced  ) is an American actress and singer-songwriter.

Early life
Fisk was born in Los Angeles, California, to actress Sissy Spacek and production designer Jack Fisk. She has a younger sister named Madison. 

Fisk began acting in school plays as a child and eventually progressed to film. Her first role was as a bumblebee in a community theatre production of Charlotte's Web. She played her first lead role, as the title character in Annie, in sixth grade.

Career

Acting
Fisk got her film breakthrough in 1995 as Kristy Thomas in The Baby-Sitters Club. Her next appearance came in the 2000 film Snow Day as Lane Leonard. She is perhaps most well known for her supporting role as Ashley in the 2002 teen comedy Orange County, starring opposite Colin Hanks and Jack Black. Her notable TV appearances include an appearance on One Tree Hill as Daytona in the 2005 episode "I'm Wide Awake, It's Morning", and an appearance on Law & Order: Special Victims Unit as Ella Christiansen in the 2006 episode "Taboo." She played the overbearing and protective sister in the 2011 film Restless.

Music

Solo career 
Fisk plays the guitar, which she learned from her mother, and sang in various musicals as a child. She began writing and playing her own songs at age 15 and, in 2004, signed with Universal Records. In 2006, she put her acting career on hold in favor of honing her skills as a musician and recorded a demo with Joshua Radin, with whom she toured for two years.  In early 2006 the duo wrote a song entitled "Paperweight." Radin introduced Fisk to Zach Braff, who in turn used the duet on the soundtrack of his film The Last Kiss; the song was also included on the Dear John soundtrack. Various projects soon followed, including recording the song "I Just Remember Goodbye" for the film Gray Matters starring Tom Cavanagh, Heather Graham, and Bridget Moynahan, and "Waking Life" for the film Penelope starring Christina Ricci.

In 2008, Fisk amicably left Universal. Plans to release an EP were scrapped in favor of releasing a full-length album, which was released digitally on January 27, 2009, as a download at several online retailers. As of the week of February 4, 2009, Fisk's debut album The Good Stuff, climbed to No. 1 on the iTunes Folk Charts. On Amazon, Fisk's album ranked No. 17 on the Folk chart in MP3 albums. The album was well received by various media outlets, including the New York Times. She then toured with Ben Taylor.

On March 1, 2011, Fisk released her second album, Blue Ribbon Winner (through her label Cassidy Barks), then toured alongside the band Harper Blynn (who collaborated with her on the title track of the album). In November 2011, Fisk released a Christmas EP titled Sounds of the Holiday on iTunes and Amazon. Tracks included holiday standards such as "Have Yourself a Merry Little Christmas," "Rockin' Around the Christmas Tree," and "Silver Bells," as well as original Christmas music. Fisk's band FM Radio debuted an album titled Out of the Blue in April 2012.

Me and My Brother 
Fisk joined another singer-songwriter in Carl Anderson and Sam Wilson, who had previously toured as part of Sons of Bill. The trio formed The Restless Hearts, though after an initial tour, the group changed their name to 'Me and My Brother'. Their first single to be released was called "Restless Heart".

Other pursuits
She graduated from the College of Arts & Sciences at the University of Virginia in 2006.

Filmography

Film

Television

Discography

Studio albums
 The Good Stuff (2009)
 Blue Ribbon Winner (2011)
 We Could Be Alright (2022)

EPs
 Songs for Now (2006)
 One World. Be Kind. (2008)
 Sounds of the Holiday (2011)

Singles

 Eastside (2021)

 Love Somebody. (2009)

Soundtracks
 "Skeletons in the Closet" ("Catching up with Yesterday") (2000)
 "Snow Day" ("It's Not Her") (2000)
 "American Gun" ("The Good Stuff") (2005)
 "I'm Reed Fish" ("From Where I'm Standing", "On Your Arm") (2006)
 "Penelope" ("Waking Life") (2006)
 "Gray Matters" ("I Just Remember Goodbye") (2006)
 "Dear John" ("Paperweight") (2010)
 Life Unexpected (TV series)
 Bride Unbridled (2010) (writer: "Fall Apart Today" – uncredited / performer: "Fall Apart Today" – uncredited)
 Ugly Betty (TV series)
 The Past Presents the Future (2010) (writer: "Be My Only" – uncredited / performer: "Be My Only" – uncredited)
 "House" (TV series – Season 8 EP 8) ("Waking Life") (2011)
 AppleBox (short) ("15 Miles Ago")  (2011)

Awards and nominations

References

External links

One on One with Schuyler Fisk
Soundcrank podcast hosted by Schuyler Fisk
Metromix 5 Questions With... Schuyler Fisk

20th-century American actresses
21st-century American actresses
Actresses from Los Angeles
American child actresses
American film actresses
American folk musicians
American women singer-songwriters
American television actresses
Living people
21st-century American singers
University of Virginia alumni
Year of birth missing (living people)